Mirchaiya formerly known as Ramnagar Mirchaiya is a municipality in Siraha District in the Madhesh Province of south-eastern Nepal. The municipality was established on 18 May 2014 by merging the existing Rampur Birta, Malhaniyakhori, Radhopur, Ramnagar Mirchaiya, Phulbariya, Sitapur PraDa and Maheshpur Gamharia Village Development Committees.  At the time of the 2017 municipality records, it had a population of approx. 52,000 people living in approx 8,496 individual households. This is one of the main business markets for Katari and the southern part of the Siraha district. Raw material produced here includes padday, miazem, and sugar cane. Frequently used Language of Mirchaiya is Maithali. However, People of this locality is well educated they can speak English, Nepali, Hindi and some other local language according to their ethnicity (language carry forward from ancient period). The famous festival of Mirchaiya is Durgapuja (Dashain, Vijaya Dashami), Jhanda Mela, Holi, Chhat puja, Shreepanchami, Deepawali. The mode of transportation mostly used include: bus, car, bike, bicycle, rickshaw, tempo, and mini bus.

Mirchaiya is considered as a trade and economic center of Sagarmatha zone and some part of Udaypur district after lahan. It was primarily an agrarian economy, but it has evolved as trade and industrial center of the region. Residents of hilly and mountainous regions of Sagarmatha zone are largely dependent on Mirchaiya for their supplies. Mirchaiya is a free wifi zone.

Educational institutions
 Shree Mohan higher secondary school (ESTD. 2003 B.S), (+2 Science, Management, Arts, etc. more)
 Sagarmatha secondary boarding school with(+2 science and management, BBS) 
 New Children Secondary English Boarding School
Times school
Swastik Pathshala
Kinder Garten English School
Axhar pathsala
Chankya school
Mithila vidya mandir
Saraswati boarding school
White House secondary boarding school
Devaki college of science and management
Shree damodrananda college
Arundoya school
Chandra Jyoti school (Nepali medium)
Sapta rishi school
Polar star higher secondary school
Himalaya Secondary English Boarding School
Unique progress boarding school
Ram janki school
Ram Janaki Vidya Mandir

Transportation 
Since, this place is totally routed by From Mahendra Highway is directly linked from capital, Kathmandu by Tata Sumo or Hiace (following the KTM-Bardibas road 6–7 hours) | following Chitwan it will take 10–11 hours or by domestic flight to either Janakpur (65 km west of Mirchaiya) or Biratnagar (145 km east of Mirchaiya) and continuation by local bus.

From India by train and road via Jayanagar as entry points to Nepal.

Well known landmarks and specialties 
 Mirchaiya Bishal Bazaar
 siraha department store
 Himalayan Katha Industries
 Maruti Cements factory
 Saradha Distiliries
 Everest Plywood
 Amrit Rice Mill 
 MS Department Store
 Digital Way Computer
 Creators engineering consultancy
 Saurya Cements
 Om Shanti Law Firm
 Mirchaiya hill park

Financial institutions 

 Global IME Bank
 NIC Asia Bank
 Rastriya Banajya Bank
 Agriculture Development Bank
 Prabhu Bank Limited
 Nepal SBI Bank
 Siddhartha Bank Limited
 Kumari Bank Limited
 Sunrise Bank Limited 
 Laxmi Bank limited
 Nabil Bank limited
 Machhapuchhre Bank
 Everest Bank Limited
 Sanima Bank Limited
 Nepal Bank Limited
 NMB Bank Limited 
 Muktinath Bikas Bank
 Kamana sewa bikas bank
 Grameen Bikas Laghubitta
 Churiya Investment Pvt. ltd
 Welcome saving and credits 
 Om Saving & Credit Co-operation

References

External links
 UN map of the municipalities of Siraha District

Populated places in Siraha District
Nepal municipalities established in 2014
Municipalities in Madhesh Province